Mira Road (Marathi pronunciation: [miɾaː]) is a suburb in the Western Suburbs of Mumbai which stretches from Bandra to Bhayander in Mumbai Metropolitan Region situated in the north-western portion of Salsette Island, Maharashtra state, India. Mira road has a large Marathis population followed by  Gujratis, Marwadi, North Indian and others. Mira road is in the Northern part of Mumbai City and lies in the North west ward within the jurisdiction of Mira-Bhayandar Municipal Corporation .

History
The rise of Mumbai's real estate prices has been instrumental in the development of the Mira-Bhayandar region. From 1947 onwards, primarily developed by Bharat Shah the rise in real estate prices prompted several largely lower and  middle-income families to migrate to the satellite cities of Mumbai like Virar, Vasai and Nalasopara. At that time, the Mira-Bhayandar area was part of a Gram Panchayat and was consisted primarily of agricultural land, majorly rice. This delayed and deterred builders from starting development projects. By 1980, builders began to buy agricultural land and start developing townships. 

The Mira Bhayandar Municipal Council was set up on June 12, 1985, by integrating five Gram Panchayats which included the Mira Gram Panchayat, which is from where Mira Road got its name.

By 1990, the council was extended and it held the first election. Gilbert Mendonca was elected as the first president of the Mira-Bhayandar Municipal Council. 

As it is located very close to the city, with easy accessibility by road as well as railway, and facilities for the city also extending to this town, have resulted in an increase in population and Mira Bhayandar as a whole, developed further. 

The Municipal Council later on 28 February 2002, was changed to a Municipal Corporation due to its large population and had its first elected mayor Smt. Maira Mendonca on 11 August. Mira Road and its neighbouring suburb Bhayandar began emerging as a fast developing suburb and experienced economic development mainly due to its manufacturing sector. Most of the development has occurred only on the east side whereas the west side of the railway line is covered with salt pans and mangroves.

Demographic 
Mira road has a large Marathis population followed by  Gujratis, Marwadi, North Indian and others. Mira road is in the Northern part of Mumbai City and lies in the North west ward within the jurisdiction of  Municipal Corporation .

Geography
Mira Road is located on the northern portion of Salsette Island and at the northern part of the Konkan region. Mira Road along with Bhayandar comes which is under the jurisdiction of Mira Bhayandar Municipal Corporation. The entire Mira-Bhayandar region lies just outside Mumbai Suburban district and officially belongs to Thane district, despite being closer to the island of Mumbai. The Mira-Bhayandar region comprises an area of 79 km2. A marshy creek divides Mumbai and Mira Road. The western part of the city is completely made up of barren lands, where salt pans were situated in the past. In the north lies Vasai Creek, to the east Sanjay Gandhi National Park and the Uttan coast, to the west. It mainly is of Deccan lava terrain and consists of waterlogged and marshy areas. The climate experienced here is tropical, wet and dry climate.

Transport
Power from the Tata Power & Reliance Energy, MTNL telecom services and BEST bus services which are normally provided to the city, are provided to this region too which has been instrumental in the increase in its population, unlike Vasai and Virar.

Mira Road has a railway station, which is a part of the Western Suburban Railway line. All trains from churchgate towards Virar halt at Mira Road. Also Mira Bhayandar Municipal Corporation has its own transportation facility Mira Bhayandar Municipal transportation (MBMT). The bus services from MSRTC which are the state transport buses are available to connect with Thane city and Manori. State transport (ST) buses are also available in Mira Road. They start from Bhayander and are available for Thane, Bhiwandi and Vasai route.

Metro 
Line 10 (Mumbai Metro) Gaimukh - Chatrapati Shivaji Maharaj Chowk (Mira Road) corridor, the line runs parallel to Thane-Bhayander highway consisting of 9 stops.

Line 9 (Mumbai Metro) Dahisar(E) - Mira Bhayander corridor, this line offers connection to the western suburbs of Mumbai.

Hospitals

 Bhaktivedanta Hospital
 Wockhardt Hospital (Umrao Hospital)

Schools / Academy 
 N.L Dalmia High School
 Seven Eleven Scholastic School, Mira Road East
 Cosmopolitan High School, Mira Road East
 Shantinagar High School,  Mira Road East 
 N.H English Academy,Mira Road East
 St. Xavier's High School, Mira Road East
 RBK School,Mira Road East

Notable People residing/originated here
 Amita Khopkar, Marathi Actress (Veteran Marathi Theatre Artist)
Syed Muzaffar Hussain, Ex-MLC (Maharashtra), Gen Sec MPCC, Indian National Congress
Kunal Khemu, Bollywood actor
 Harshaali Malhotra, Bollywood child artist
 Narendra Mehta, Ex-MLA (BJP)
 Geeta Bharat Jain, Current MLA (Independent)
 Ayush Mahesh Khedekar, Bollywood actor
 Madhur Mittal, Bollywood actor
 Kavi Kumar Azad, Indian television actor

References

External links

 

Transport in Mira-Bhayandar
Transport in Navi Mumbai
Transport in Thane district
Suburbs of Mumbai